Tim Vivian is an American scholar of Early Christianity and professor emeritus (retired) of Religious Studies at California State University, Bakersfield (or CSUB).

Vivian received a Bachelor of Arts in English from the University of California, Santa Barbara, a Master of Arts in American literature from California Polytechnic State University (San Luis Obispo), and a Master of Arts in comparative literature from the University of California, Santa Barbara. He then earned an interdisciplinary Doctor of Philosophy degree in classics, history, and religious studies from the University of California, Santa Barbara with a doctoral dissertation on "Saint Peter of Alexandria: Bishop and Martyr” in 1985 under the direction of Birger A. Pearson. He next earned a M.Div. from the Church Divinity School of the Pacific and went on to do research as a Henry R. Luce Post-Doctoral Fellow at Yale Divinity School.

Vivian has taught at CSUB since 1990 (working his way up from lecturer to full professor). He has published over 15 books, over 50 journal articles, and over 100 scholarly book reviews. He won the Faculty Scholarship & Creative Activity award at California State University, Bakersfield, in 2007/2008. He serves on the board of advisors for the Cistercian Studies Quarterly and on the editorial board of Coptica. Vivian is also an ordained priest of the Episcopal Church. On April 26, 2018, Vivian was granted professor emeritus status at California State University, Bakersfield. On October 11, 2018, Vivian was awarded an honorary Doctor of Divinity degree from the Church Divinity School of the Pacific for his scholarship and work for social justice.

His major publications include:
   "The Life of Antony" (with Apostolos Athanassakis) (Kalamazoo: Cistercian Publications, 2003).
   "Becoming Fire: Through the Year with the Desert Fathers and Mothers" (Collegeville, MN: Cistercian Publications/Liturgical Press, 2009).
   "The Holy Workshop of Virtue: The Life of Saint John the Little" (with Maged S. A. Mikhail) (Collegeville, MN: Cistercian Publications/Liturgical Press, 2010).
 "The Sayings and Stories of the Desert Fathers and Mothers, Volume 1; A–H (Ȇta)" (Collegeville, MN: Cistercian Publications, 2021).
  "The Life of Bishoi: Translations of the Greek, Syriac, Ethiopic, and Arabic Texts" (ed. with Maged S. A. Mikhail) (Cairo, Egypt: The American University in Cairo Press, 2022).

Although Vivian’s research emphasis is on early Christianity, especially Coptic Studies and early Christian Monasticism, he has published broadly in religious history. He is the recipient of the 2015 Nelson R. Burr Prize of the Historical Society of the Episcopal Church (HSEC) for his article “Wake the Devil from His Dream: Thomas Dudley, Quincy Ewing, Religion, and the ‘Race Problem’ in the Jim Crow South” published in the December 2014 issue of Anglican and Episcopal History.

Vivian is also a published poet with published collections including Other Voices, Other Rooms (Eugene, OR: Wipf and Stock, 2020) and Poems Written in a Time of Plague: Further Reflections on Scripture (Eugene, OR: Wipf and Stock, 2020).

Publications (selected)
 Saint Peter of Alexandria: Bishop and Martyr (Minneapolis: Fortress Press, 1988).
 Paphnutius: Histories of the Monks of Upper Egypt and the Life of Onnophrius (Kalamazoo: Cistercian Publications, 1993).
 Two Coptic Homilies Attributed to Saint Peter of Alexandria (with Birger A. Pearson) (Rome: Opus dei Copti manoscritti litterari, 1993).
 The Life of Saint George of Choziba and The Miracles of the Most Holy Mother of God at Choziba (with Apostolos Athanassakis) (San Francisco: International Scholars Publications, 1994). Edition of Antony of Choziba's biography of George of Choziba.
 Journeying into God: Seven Early Monastic Lives (Minneapolis: Fortress Press, 1996).
 The Life of the Jura Fathers (with Kim Vivian & Jeffrey Burton Russell) (Kalamazoo: Cistercian Publications, 2000).
 Paphnutius: Histories of the Monks of Upper Egypt and the Life of Onnophrius (rev. ed., Cistercian Publications, 2000).
 The Life of Antony  (with Apostolos Athanassakis) (Kalamazoo: Cistercian Publications, 2003).
 Four Desert Fathers: Pambo, Evagrius, Macarius of Egypt, and Macarius of Alexandria. Coptic Texts Relating to the Lausiac History of Palladius (Crestwood, NY: St. Vladimir's Seminary Press, 2004).
 Saint Macarius the Spiritbearer: Coptic Texts Relating to Saint Macarius the Great (Crestwood, NY: St. Vladimir's Seminary Press, 2004).
 Words to Live By: Journeys in Ancient and Modern Monasticism (Kalamazoo: Cistercian Publications, 2005).
 Witness to Holiness: Abba Daniel of Scetis (with numerous scholars) (Kalamazoo: Cistercian Publications, 2008).
 Becoming Fire: Through the Year with the Desert Fathers and Mothers (Collegeville, MN: Cistercian Publications/Liturgical Press, 2009).
 Mark the Monk: Counsels on the Spiritual Life, Volumes I & 2 (with Augustine Casiday) (Crestwood, NY: St. Vladimir's Seminary Press, 2009).
 The Holy Workshop of Virtue: The Life of Saint John the Little (with Maged S. A. Mikhail) (Collegeville, MN: Cistercian Publications/Liturgical Press, 2010).
 The Sayings and Stories of the Desert Fathers and Mothers, Volume 1; A–H (Ȇta) (Collegeville, MN: Cistercian Publications, 2021).
  Door of the Wilderness: The Greek, Coptic, and Copto-Arabic Sayings of St. Antony of Egypt (with Lisa Agaiby) (Leiden: Brill, 2021).
  The Life of Bishoi: Translations of the Greek, Syriac, Ethiopic, and Arabic Texts (ed. with Maged S. A. Mikhail) (Cairo, Egypt: The American University in Cairo Press, 2022).
   “The Origins of Monasticism,” in "The T&T Clark Handbook of the Early Church," ed. Ilaria L. E. Ramelli, et al. (London: T&T Clark, 2022), 483–500.

References

External links 
 https://www.worldcat.org/search?q=au%3AVivian%2C+Tim.&qt=hot_author

Historians of Christianity
Historians from California
California State University, Bakersfield faculty
University of California, Santa Barbara alumni
California Polytechnic State University alumni
Church Divinity School of the Pacific alumni
Yale Divinity School alumni
American Episcopal priests
Living people
American historians of religion
Year of birth missing (living people)